House on Telegraph Hill is a 1951 American film noir starring Richard Basehart, Valentina Cortese, and William Lundigan, and directed by Robert Wise. The film received an Academy Award nomination for its art direction. Telegraph Hill is a dominant hill overlooking the water in northeast San Francisco.

Plot
Polish woman Viktoria Kowalska (Valentina Cortese) has lost her home and her husband in the German occupation of Poland, and is imprisoned in the concentration camp at Belsen. She befriends another prisoner, Karin Dernakova (Natasha Lytess), who dreams of reuniting with her young son Christopher (Gordon Gebert), who was sent to live in San Francisco with a wealthy aunt.

Karin dies shortly before the camp can be liberated, and Viktoria, seeing a way to a better life, uses Karin's papers to assume her identity. The camp is liberated by Americans (in reality the camp was liberated by the British), and Viktoria is interviewed by Major Marc Bennett (William Lundigan), who gets her a place in a camp for people displaced by the war. She writes to Karin's Aunt Sophia in San Francisco, but receives a cable from lawyers that Sophia has died.

Four years later, Viktoria (still going by the name of Karin) is able to travel to New York City, where she meets with Christopher's guardian Alan Spender (Richard Basehart), a distant relative of Sophia. "Karin" intends to gain custody of "her" son, but it becomes clear that Sophia has left her fortune to Christopher when he comes of age. When she realizes that Alan is attracted to her, she decides that it will be easier to stay in America if she has an American husband. She allows him to romance her, and they soon marry. Alan takes Karin to San Francisco where Christopher meets his "mother" for the first time, and she settles into Sophia's Italianate mansion on Telegraph Hill, where Christopher lives with Alan and his governess, Margaret (Fay Baker).

Things seem idyllic at first, but tensions begin to mount between Karin and Margaret, who has not only raised Christopher but also is in love with Alan. Margaret resents Karin for intruding on her life. Karin also is alarmed at the presence of a burnt-out, dangerously damaged playhouse overlooking the hill, which Christopher claims to have damaged with an explosion from his toy chemistry set. He and Margaret beg her not to tell Alan because Margaret never has, but Karin is perplexed to discover that he already knows about it. Karin is pleased, however, to meet Marc Bennett again, learning he is an old schoolmate of her husband and a partner for the law firm that handles Sophia's affairs. He clearly is attracted to Karin, but keeps a respectful distance.

Karin investigates the playhouse, but she is surprised by Alan while she is in there and nearly falls to her death through a hole in the floor. Alan pulls her up, but appears to be alarmed by her behavior. Soon after, the brakes on Karin's car fail. She escapes unharmed but suspects Margaret of tampering with the car. When she realizes Christopher was supposed to have been in the car with her, Karin comes to believe that Alan is behind the accident because Alan will inherit Sophia's money if Christopher were to die. With Marc's help, she begins to investigate, learning that Marc's law firm, which supposedly sent her the cable regarding Sophia's death, has no record of the cable's being sent. She also grows significantly more nervous around Alan.

Karin discovers a newspaper clipping in Margaret's scrapbook confirming that the cable was sent three days before Sophia's death: It is a fake, and Alan killed Sophia. She attempts to call Marc, but she is prevented from doing so when Alan arrives home. He does not let her out of his sight for the rest of the evening. When he brings in the orange juice that the pair drink every night before bed, she is sure her glass has been poisoned. When he briefly leaves the room, she attempts to call the police, but Alan left the phone off the hook in another room, and calls cannot be made. He returns to the bedroom and coerces her into drinking the orange juice, and after her, he drinks his own. Thinking himself safe, he confesses that he has murdered Sophia and that he has given her an overdose of sedatives in her orange juice. Karin tells him that she has switched the glasses and that he has poisoned himself. She tries to telephone a doctor but cannot get through. Margaret is awakened by the commotion, and Alan begs her to call a doctor. Realizing that he has killed Sophia and tried to kill Christopher and Karin, Margaret refuses and Alan dies.

Margaret is arrested for refusing to aid Alan, and Karin, who has confessed her true identity to Marc, leaves the house with him and Christopher to begin a new life.

Cast
 Richard Basehart as Alan Spender
 Valentina Cortese (Valentina Cortesa, in the opening credits) Victoria Kowalska
 William Lundigan as Major Marc Bennett
 Fay Baker as Margaret
 Gordon Gebert as Christopher
 Steven Geray as Dr. Burkhardt
 Herb Butterfield as Joseph C. Callahan
 John Burton as Mr. Whitmore
 Katherine Meskill as Mrs. Whitmore
 Mario Siletti as Tony, the Grocer
 Charles Wagenheim as Man at Accident
 David Clarke as Mechanic
 Tamara Schee as Maria
 Natasha Lytess as Karin Dernakova

Production notes
Parts of the film - including the runaway car scene - were shot on location in the Telegraph Hill area of San Francisco. Long shots of the exterior of the mansion were a combination of matte paintings and studio-made facades that were erected in front of the house at 1541 Montgomery Street. This was the location of the longtime Telegraph Hill restaurant called Julius' Castle, which closed its doors in 2008 after operating for 84 years. Closer shots of the exterior entrance and driveway were filmed on a studio lot, and scenes for the garden and backyard were filmed on the lawn of Coit Tower. The corner market seen in the film was Speedy's New Union Grocery at 301 Union at the corner of Montgomery, which also closed in 2008 after 93 years in business. Marc Bennett's office building was the Crocker flatiron building located at One Post Street, which in 1969 was demolished and replaced by the skyscraper now known as McKesson Plaza.

Reception

Critical response
When the film was released the staff at Variety magazine wrote, "This is a slow but interesting melodrama about a psychopathic killer, with San Francisco's quaint hill residential sections as background ... [with a] [s]inister mood, and heightened tensions, are well sustained, and performances by Basehart and Cortese convey the drama convincingly. William Lundigan is okay as the attorney who befriends the woman."

In 2006 film critic Dennis Schwartz generally liked the film, writing "Robert Wise (West Side Story/The Sound of Music) ably directs this Gothic film noir ... The stark black-and-white photography by Lucien Ballard, the good performances (especially by Basehart) and the intriguing plot developments kept me tuned in throughout even though it was slow going. Of personal interest, Basehart and the Italian actress Cortese met for the first time on this film, and fell in love and married."

Awards
Nomination
 Academy Awards: Best Art Direction - Lyle Wheeler, John DeCuir, Thomas Little and Paul S. Fox; 1952.

References

External links
 
 
 
 
 The House on Telegraph Hill information site and DVD review at DVD Beaver (includes images)
  by Eddie Muller
 

1951 films
1951 drama films
1950s English-language films
1950s thriller drama films
1950s American films
American drama films
American thriller drama films
American black-and-white films
Film noir
Films based on American novels
Films directed by Robert Wise
Films scored by Sol Kaplan
Films set in country houses
Films set in San Francisco
20th Century Fox films